Charles Edgar Woodward (December 1, 1876 – May 15, 1942) was a United States district judge of the United States District Court for the Northern District of Illinois.

Education and career

Born in New Salem, Pennsylvania, Woodward attended Northwestern University and read law in 1899. He was in private practice in Ottawa, Illinois from 1899 to 1929, also serving as an assistant Attorney General of Illinois from 1905 to 1913, and President of the Illinois Constitutional Convention in 1920.

Federal judicial service

On March 1, 1929, Woodward was nominated by President Calvin Coolidge to a seat on the United States District Court for the Northern District of Illinois vacated by Judge Adam C. Cliffe. Woodward was confirmed by the United States Senate on March 2, 1929, and received his commission the same day. He served in that capacity until his death on May 15, 1942.

References

Sources
 

1876 births
1942 deaths
People from New Salem, Pennsylvania
Judges of the United States District Court for the Northern District of Illinois
United States district court judges appointed by Calvin Coolidge
20th-century American judges
People from Ottawa, Illinois
United States federal judges admitted to the practice of law by reading law